The 1932 German football championship Final decided the winner of the 1932 German football championship, the 25th of the German football championship, a knockout football cup competition contested by the regional league winners to determine the national champions. It was played on 12 June 1932 at the Städtisches Stadion in Nuremberg. Bayern Munich won the match 2–0 against Eintracht Frankfurt, to claim their 1st German title.

Route to the final
The German football championship began with 16 teams in a single-elimination knockout competition. There were a total of three rounds leading up to the final. Teams were drawn against each other, and the winner after 90 minutes would advance. If still tied, extra time, and if necessary a replay were used to determine the winner.

Note: In all results below, the score of the finalist is given first (H: home; A: away; N: neutral).

Match

Details

References

FC Bayern Munich matches
Eintracht Frankfurt matches
German football championship Final
1932